Steven Lynn Chilcott (born September 23, 1948) is an American former professional baseball player. He played in minor league baseball as a catcher from 1966 to 1972. Chilcott was chosen as the first overall selection in the 1966 Major League Baseball Draft, by the New York Mets. He is one of three players to be drafted first overall in the Major League Baseball Draft and never play in the major leagues, along with Brien Taylor and Brady Aiken.

Early life 
Born in  Lancaster, California, Chilcott attended Antelope Valley High School.

Athletic career
After graduating high school, Chilcott was chosen as the first overall pick by the New York Mets in the 1966 Major League Baseball Draft. (Famously, he was chosen one spot ahead of future Hall of Famer Reggie Jackson.) In 1967, during his second season in the minor leagues, he injured his shoulder while playing for the Winter Haven Mets in the Florida State League. After reaching second base as a baserunner, he dove back toward the base when the pitcher tried to pick him off. As he dove back to the bag, he slammed into it with full force on his right arm, dislocating his shoulder and ending his season. 

Chilcott was plagued by injuries for the rest of his baseball career. The Mets released him in 1971, and he signed with the New York Yankees. However, he was released after only playing 24 games in 1972, and his athletic career was over at age 24. Chilcott never played higher than Triple-A, and is one of only three retired number-one picks to have never played a major league game.

Post-athletic career 
Chilcott then began a career as a firefighter in the mid-1970s, working as a temporary in the Santa Barbara Fire Department. He later became a full-time contractor, constructing and remodeling homes.

References

External links

1948 births
Living people
American expatriate baseball players in Canada
Winter Haven Mets players
Fort Lauderdale Yankees players
Visalia Mets players
West Haven Yankees players
Marion Mets players
Auburn Mets players
Buffalo Bisons (minor league) players
Tidewater Tides players
Memphis Blues players
Winnipeg Whips players
Baseball players from California
People from Lancaster, California
Antelope Valley High School alumni